Dana James Hutton (May 31, 1934 – June 2, 1979), known as Jim Hutton, was an American actor in film and television best remembered for his role as Ellery Queen in the 1970s TV series of the same name, and his screen partnership with Paula Prentiss in four films, starting with Where the Boys Are. He is the father of actor Timothy Hutton.

Early life 
Hutton was born on May 31, 1934, in Binghamton, New York, the son of Helen and Thomas R. Hutton, an editor and managing editor of the Binghamton Press. Hutton's parents divorced while he was an infant, and he never knew his father.
During his childhood, he enjoyed sports and playing games with his friends.
Hutton was expelled from five high schools and a boarding school due to behavior problems, but had excellent grades and test scores. After starting his school newspaper's sports column, he earned a scholarship in journalism from Syracuse University in 1952. He was expelled from Syracuse after driving a bulldozer through a bed of tulips near the library while drunk.

Hutton then enrolled at Niagara University, where he began pursuing an acting career. He performed in summer stock in Connecticut and La Jolla, and won state oratory competitions. 

In 1955, he moved back to New York, where he became, in his own words, a "beatnik". He struggled to find acting work. Worried about being able to make ends meet, he joined the U.S. Army.

Military service
Hutton served in the United States Army from 1956 and starred in over 40 Army training films before going to Berlin to serve in special services.  Hutton personally founded the American Community Theater by spearheading the renovation of theaters abandoned during World War II. He established the first English-speaking theater in Berlin.  "They turned out to be the kickiest two years of my life", he later said.

Hutton was performing in live theater in Germany, playing Captain Queeg in a production of The Caine Mutiny Court Martial, while with the  Army, when he was spotted by American film director Douglas Sirk. Sirk offered him in a small role in a film, A Time to Love and a Time to Die (1958), if he could get leave to join the unit in Nuremberg.  Hutton made his debut in the film as a neurotic German soldier who commits suicide. Universal saw footage and expressed interest in offering him a long-term contract. While in Germany, Hutton also had a small role in Ten Seconds to Hell (1959).

When Hutton got out of the Army, he moved to Hollywood, but discovered the offer from Universal had expired. He got an agent, though, and started doing auditions.

Acting

Early television roles
One of his earliest roles was on the TV show "The Big Attack" (1956-57) in ep-1 "Big Slim"  where you see his talent shine through while serving in Germany. His first notable screen appearance was in the episode "And When the Sky Was Opened" of The Twilight Zone (1959), in which he co-starred with Rod Taylor. He also guest-starred on episodes of Father Knows Best and Tate. 

In 1959, he appeared on stage at the La Jolla Playhouse in Look Homeward Angel alongside Miriam Hopkins.

Metro-Goldwyn-Mayer
Hutton auditioned for Metro-Goldwyn-Mayer executives Al Tresconi and Ben Thau. They were impressed enough to offer him a long-term contract.  "But after that, they didn't seem to know what to do with me", he said. "I don't fall easily into a mold and they tried different things."

MGM put him in The Subterraneans (1960), a drama about "beatniks". The film was a big flop, but Hutton was then cast in a teen comedy for the same studio, Where the Boys Are (1960), where he appeared alongside a number of young players under contract to the studio, including George Hamilton, Connie Francis, Yvette Mimieux, and Paula Prentiss. The movie was a huge success.

Due to his tall, gangly frame and the absent-minded quality of his delivery, Hutton was viewed as a successor to James Stewart. 
Hutton was romantically teamed in the film with Prentiss, in part because they were the tallest MGM contract players of their time (Hutton at 6'5" and Prentiss at 5'10"), and public feedback being positive, MGM decided to make them a regular team, along the lines of William Powell and Myrna Loy.

Hutton appeared with Prentiss in The Honeymoon Machine (1961) supporting Steve McQueen, which was a hit. Then, they made Bachelor in Paradise (1961) starring Bob Hope and Lana Turner, which lost money. Hutton and Prentiss were given top billing in The Horizontal Lieutenant (1962), which was a box-office disappointment. "We're not being thrown into films together to play the same parts", said Hutton. "Paula and I have spent too much time and money on our careers, and if teaming together happens to go hand and glove with advancing our careers, then fine."

Hutton and Prentiss were announced for Away from Home to be shot in Mexico by producer Edmund Grainer, but the film appears to have not been made. Neither was another announced for them, And So To Bed, to be written and directed by Frank Tashlin.

Hutton was meant to play a role in How the West Was Won (1962), a soldier who tries to desert and fights with George Peppard, but Russ Tamblyn ended up playing the role.

In February 1962, Prentiss and he made the exhibitors list of the top 10 "stars of tomorrow" alongside Hayley Mills, Nancy Kwan, Horst Bucholz, Carol Lynley, Dolores Hart, Juliet Prowse, Connie Stevens, and Warren Beatty.

MGM tried Hutton in a comedy-drama with Jane Fonda, Period of Adjustment (1962), directed by George Roy Hill. It was a hit at the box office.  MGM announced they would reteam him with Prentiss in Follow the Boys but he was not in the final film; Prentiss' love interest was played by Russ Tamblyn.

He did some stage acting at the La Jolla Playhouse in Write Me a Murder in 1962.

He was Connie Francis's leading man in Looking for Love (1964) (in which Hamilton, Mimieux, and Prentiss had cameos). The movie was not a success. He was going to be Sandra Dee's leading man in The Richest Girl in Town but was replaced by Andy Williams for the final film, which became I'd Rather Be Rich.

Columbia
Hutton was tired of playing in comedies. In the words of Hedda Hopper, he refused "one script after another" from MGM for 15 months before the studio eventually released him from his contract. He signed a one-year contract with Universal and received an offer to make a Western at Columbia, Major Dundee,  which was directed by Sam Peckinpah, and Hutton played the third lead after Charlton Heston and Richard Harris, an ineffective officer. Filming took place in Mexico.  He followed it with another expensive Western, The Hallelujah Trail (1965) with Burt Lancaster, directed by John Sturges for United Artists. Both films were financial disappointments, although Dundee'''s reputation has risen in recent years.

Hutton was the male juvenile in Never Too Late (1965) with Paul Ford and Connie Stevens, at Warner Bros.

"The Major Dundee and Hallelujah Trail parts were good", he said in an interview around this time, "but they were peripheral. I'm ready for a take charge part. In all immodesty, I don't believe there are many guys my age who can play comedy. Jack Lemmon is the master, but who among the younger guys can you think of? A lot of them can clown and laugh at their own jokes."

Hutton made a pilot for a sitcom about a travelling salesman, Barney, written and directed by Shelley Berman for Screen Gems, but it was not picked up.  He made a cameo in The Trouble with Angels,  and was the second male lead in Walk, Don't Run (1966), a comedy with Samantha Eggar and Cary Grant (in Grant's last feature-film appearance) at Columbia. Director Charles Walters says Hutton was Grant's personal choice for the role. "Cary identifies with Hutton", he said. The success of this film had Hutton given the lead in Columbia's comedy Who's Minding the Mint? (1967), but it was not widely seen. He was announced for the lead in A Guide for the Married Man but when the script changed, he ended up asking to be released from it.

In November 1966, Hutton signed a nonexclusive, two-year deal with 20th Century Fox. However, he did not appear in any Fox films.

John Wayne
In July 1967, Hutton signed to appear in the John Wayne war drama, The Green Berets, in which Hutton played a Special Forces sergeant in a mix of comedy and drama, with a memorable booby trap death scene.

Also in 1968, Hutton appeared with Wayne in Hellfighters, playing the role of Greg Parker. The movie was loosely based on the career of oil-well firefighter Red Adair.

Return to television
In the early 1970s, Hutton began working almost exclusively in television, guest-starring on such shows as The Psychiatrist; Love, American Style (several times), and The Name of the Game. He was in two TV movies, the thriller The Deadly Hunt (1971) and a war film, The Reluctant Heroes of Hill 656 (1971).

Hutton played Erle Stanley Gardner's small-town district attorney hero, Doug Selby, in They Call It Murder (1971), a TV movie that was a pilot for a proposed series that never came about. He also co-starred with Connie Stevens in Call Her Mom (1972), another TV movie that was a pilot for a series that was not picked up. He tried three failed sitcom pilots, Wednesday Night Out, Call Holme, and Captain Newman, M.D. (the latter, written by Richard Crenna, screened as a TV movie).

He starred in Don't Be Afraid of the Dark (1973) and The Underground Man (1974) and episodes of Marcus Welby, M.D., The Wide World of Mystery, and Ironside.

His last theatrical film was Psychic Killer (1975) directed by Ray Danton. "Much of my career downfall was my own fault," he said around this time.

Ellery Queen
Hutton had not auditioned since Period of Adjustment, but agreed to do it for the role of fictional amateur detective Ellery Queen in the 1975 made-for-television movie and 1975–1976 television series, Ellery Queen. Hutton's co-star in the series (set in 1946–1947 New York City) was David Wayne, who portrayed his widowed father, an NYPD homicide detective. Ellery, a writer of murder mysteries, assisted his father as an amateur, each week solving an "actual" murder case. Near the end of each story, before revealing the solution, he would "break the fourth wall" by giving the audience a brief review of the clues and asking if they had solved the mystery.  "It's the first opportunity I've had in a long time to show people I can give a good performance," he said.  It ran for 23 episodes.

One of Hutton's memorable television appearances was appearing as a guest star in the 1977–1978 third-season premiere of the Norman Lear sitcom One Day at a Time. The episode, titled "The Older Man", was a four-part story arc in which Hutton portrayed Dr. Paul Curran, a 42-year-old veterinarian who falls in love with 17-year-old Julie Cooper (played by Mackenzie Phillips).

Final years
Hutton's final performances included roles in Flying High, $weepstake$, and The Wonderful World of Disney ("The Sky Trap").

His last television role was in an unsold pilot called Butterflies, based on the BBC2 sitcom of the same name. It was broadcast on NBC in August 1979, about two months after Hutton had died.

Personal life
Hutton was married to Maryline Adams (née Poole), who was a teacher. They divorced in 1963. They had two children: a daughter, Heidi (born 1959), and a son, Timothy (born 1960). Timothy also became an actor and appeared with his father in a summer-stock production of Harvey. In 1970, he married Lynni Solomon, and they had daughter Punch Hutton (former deputy fashion editor of Vanity Fair). Hutton also had an intermittent 15-year relationship with actress and model Yvette Vickers.

Death
On June 2, 1979, Hutton died of liver cancer, two days after his 45th birthday, and a month after being diagnosed. He was cremated and his ashes were interred at the Garden of Roses area of Westwood Village Memorial Park. 

FilmographyA Time to Love and a Time to Die (1958) — HirschlandTen Seconds to Hell (1959) — Workman at Bomb Site (uncredited)The Subterraneans (1960) — Adam MooradWhere the Boys Are (1960) — TV ThompsonThe Honeymoon Machine (1961) — Jason EldridgeBachelor in Paradise (1961) — Larry DelavaneThe Horizontal Lieutenant (1962) — Second Lt. Merle WyePeriod of Adjustment (1962) — George HaverstickSunday in New York (1963) — Man in Rowboat with Radio (uncredited)Looking for Love (1964) — Paul DavisMajor Dundee (1965) — Lieutenant GrahamThe Hallelujah Trail (1965) — Captain Paul SlaterNever Too Late (1965) — Charlie ClintonThe Trouble with Angels (1966) — Mr. Petrie (uncredited)Walk, Don't Run (1966) — Steve DavisWho's Minding the Mint? (1967) — Harry LucasThe Green Berets (1968) — Sgt. PetersenHellfighters (1968) — Greg ParkerDon’t Be Afraid of the Dark (1973) - Alex FarnhamPsychic Killer (1975) — Arnold James MastersThe Sky Trap'' (1979) — Joe Reese

References

External links

1934 births
1979 deaths
20th-century American male actors
American male film actors
American male television actors
Burials at Westwood Village Memorial Park Cemetery
Deaths from liver cancer
Deaths from cancer in California
Male actors from New York (state)
Niagara University alumni
Actors from Binghamton, New York
Military personnel from New York (state)
Syracuse University alumni
United States Army soldiers